The 1896 United States presidential election in Nebraska took place on November 3, 1896. All contemporary 45 states were part of the 1896 United States presidential election. Voters chose eight electors to the Electoral College, which selected the president and vice president.

Nebraska was won by the Democratic nominees, former U.S. Representative and Nebraska native William Jennings Bryan and his Democratic running mate Arthur Sewall of Maine. Four electors cast their vice presidential ballots for Thomas E. Watson, who was Bryan's running mate on the Populist Party.

As a result of his win, Bryan became the first Democratic presidential candidate to win Nebraska. Bryan would later lose the state to William McKinley in 1900 but would later win it again against William Howard Taft in 1908.

Results

Results by county

See also
 United States presidential elections in Nebraska

Notes

References

Nebraska
1896
1896 Nebraska elections